Dhoom is the first ever album by Indian rock band Euphoria released in 1998. They followed it up with the album Phir Dhoom.

Track listing 
 Sha Na Na Na (शा ना ना ना)..
 Dhoom Pichuck (धुम पिचक)
 Tum (तुम)
 Hind Rock'n'Roll (हिंद रॉक एन रॉल)
 Rick's Lick (रिक्स लिक)
 Aamne Saamne (आमने सामने)
 Kyon Judaa (क्यों जुदा)
 Body Love (बोडी लव) 
 D.J's 'Bass'ic Instinct (डी.जे.'स बसिक इंस्टिन्क्ट)
 Tumse Pyaar (तुमसे प्यार)
 Maa li (दिल्ली)

Some songs are available for free download form the Lounge section of the band's official website.

The female model in the music video of Dhoom is Michelle Innes

Videography

References

{https://www.youtube.com/watch?v=DT-xVHCqIoU&index=213&list=LLKHQ9u1DMhmT3Ahdl2bUGjg}

External links
Dhoom website

Euphoria (Indian band) albums
1998 debut albums